There are two species of gecko named Somali rock gecko:
 Pristurus somalicus
 Pristurus phillipsii